In human neuroanatomy, the pancreatic plexus is a division of the celiac plexus (coeliac plexus) in the abdomen.

External links

Nerve plexus
Nerves of the torso